Alessandro Fabbri (born 11 March 1990) is an Italian professional footballer who plays as a left back for  club Trento.

Club career
Formed in Rimini youth sector, Fabbri made his senior debut for Santarcangelo in 2009–10 season.

On 3 July 2018, he joined Serie C club Südtirol. Fabbri played his 100 official match for the club on 21 February 2021 against Padova.

On 15 June 2022, Fabbri signed a two-year contract with Trento.

References

External links
 
 

1990 births
Living people
People from Cesena
Footballers from Emilia-Romagna
Italian footballers
Association football fullbacks
Serie C players
Serie D players
Eccellenza players
Rimini F.C. 1912 players
Santarcangelo Calcio players
A.S.D. Mezzolara players
A.C. Mestre players
F.C. Südtirol players
S.P. Tre Fiori players
A.C. Trento 1921 players
Italian expatriate footballers
Italian expatriate sportspeople in San Marino
Expatriate footballers in San Marino
Sportspeople from the Province of Forlì-Cesena